Gurrë is a former commune in the Dibër County, northern Albania. At the 2015 local government reform it became a subdivision of the municipality Klos. The population at the 2011 census was 3,369.

Demographic history
Gurrë (Gur) is recorded in the Ottoman defter of 1467 as village in the timar of Barak in the vilayet of Mati. The settlement had a total of nine households represented by the following household heads: Kolë Kibaj, Dom Pali, Gjon Guribardi, Dom Andrija,  Mihal Girdepaj, Gjergj Mizijo, Todor Bila, Buzi Bardi, and Martin Bili (Beli).

References

Former municipalities in Dibër County
Administrative units of Klos (municipality)